Diospyros racemosa, is a semi-evergreen and also a dioecious tree in the ebony family with up to 20 m tall, distributed in India, and Sri Lanka. It is a well known ayurvedic plant used in Sri Lanka, where it is known as "kaha kala" or "kaluwella" by Sinhalese people.

References

jstor.org

External links
uniprot
Preliminary Phytochemical Analysis of Diospyros Species

racemosa
Flora of tropical Asia